Art  is a French-language play by Yasmina Reza that premiered in 1994 at Comédie des Champs-Élysées in Paris. The play subsequently ran in London in 1996 and on Broadway in 1998.

Productions
The play premiered on 28 October 1994 at Comédie des Champs-Élysées in Paris.

The English-language adaptation, translated by Christopher Hampton and directed by Matthew Warchus opened in London's West End on 15 October 1996 at the Wyndham's Theatre (before moving to the Whitehall Theatre in October 2001) starring Albert Finney, Tom Courtenay and Ken Stott, produced by David Pugh and Sean Connery running for over six years until 3 January 2003, with Reece Shearsmith, Steve Pemberton and Mark Gatiss (aka The League of Gentlemen) in the final cast.

Art played on Broadway in New York at the Royale Theatre from 12 February 1998 to 8 August 1999, again produced by Pugh and Connery, plus Joan Cullman. The opening cast featured Alan Alda (Marc), Victor Garber (Serge), and Alfred Molina (Yvan), who was nominated for a Tony Award for Best Actor in a Play for his performance. Art won the Tony for Best Play and went on to a 600-performance run.

From December 2016 to February 2017 the production, directed by Matthew Warchus was revived at The Old Vic in London to celebrate its 20th anniversary, starring Rufus Sewell, Tim Key and Paul Ritter and began touring the UK from February 2018 starring Nigel Havers, Denis Lawson and Stephen Tompkinson.

In August 2021, a Canadian theatre company Crane Creations led a play reading event of 'Art'. A group of professional theatre artists discussed the form, themes, style, and current world issues related to the play. The play reading event aims to raise appreciation of playwrights and playwrighting from around the globe.

Overview
The comedy, which raises questions about art and friendship, concerns three long-time friends, Serge, Marc, and Yvan. Serge, indulging his penchant for modern art, buys a large, expensive, completely white painting. Marc is horrified, and their relationship suffers considerable strain as a result of their differing opinions about what constitutes "art". Yvan, caught in the middle of the conflict, tries to please and mollify both of them.

The play is not divided into acts and scenes in the traditional manner, but it does nevertheless fall into sections (numbered 1–17 by Pigeat). Some of these are dialogues between two characters, several are monologues where one of the characters addresses the audience directly, and one is a conversation among all three. At the beginning and end of the play, and for most of the scenes set in Serge's flat, the large white painting is on prominent display.

Plot 

Set in Paris, the play revolves around three friends—Serge, Marc and Yvan—who find their previously solid 15-year friendship on shaky ground when Serge buys an expensive painting. The canvas is white, with several fine white lines.

Marc, appalled to hear that Serge had paid two hundred thousand francs, scornfully describes it as "a piece of white shit". Serge argues that the painting, created by a reputable artist, is worth its hefty price, but Marc remains unconvinced.

Serge and Marc confide in Yvan about their disagreement. Yvan, who is engaged but conflicted over his forthcoming wedding, remains neutral and attempts to smooth things over. To Serge, Yvan comments politely on the painting but admits that he does not grasp the essence of it. To Marc, Yvan laughs at the painting's price but suggests that the work is not quite meaningless. Yvan's vacillations only fuel the disagreement as his friends criticize his timid neutrality.

Several nights later the three meet for dinner, and an all-out argument rapidly develops with each using the painting as an excuse to criticise the others over perceived failures. Marc attacks Yvan for never expressing any substantial opinions, and for being an "arse-licker" in the ongoing conflict between his fiancée, his in-laws, and his mother. Marc and Serge argue that Yvan should call off the marriage, to which Yvan responds with lame excuses. Serge criticizes Marc's unwillingness to accept that his friends’ opinions differ from his own; and he reveals that he has for some time despised Marc's girlfriend.

Marc finally admits that his true resentment is not the painting itself but the uncharacteristic independence of thought that the purchase reveals in Serge. He recalls that Serge used to share his own views on arts and culture, and he feels abandoned now that Serge has developed his own, modern taste. Marc says that friends must always influence each other, but Serge finds that view to be possessive and controlling. Yvan, at last defending himself, sobbingly explains that he tries to be tolerant and agreeable because he values companionship over dominance: their friendship is his only sanctuary in his burdensome life.

After Yvan's outburst, the friends calm down. The argument wordlessly settles as Serge allows Marc to deface the painting using a blue felt-tip pen. Marc draws a person skiing along one of the white lines on the painting. Serge and Marc agree to attempt to rebuild their friendship, and they begin by washing the pen marks off the painting. Marc asks Serge whether he had known that the ink was washable; Serge replies that he had not. But he had indeed known that, and feels troubled about his lie. Marc concludes by describing his own interpretation of the painting: it is of a man who moves across the canvas and disappears.

Awards and nominations
Awards

 April 1995 Molière Award for Best Commercial Production
 1997 Laurence Olivier Award for Best New Comedy
 May 1998 New York Drama Critics' Circle – Best Play
 1998 Tony Award for Best Play
 1998 Drama Desk Outstanding Featured Actor in a Play (Molina)
 November 1998 Evening Standard Award for Best Comedy

Nominations

 1997 Olivier Award for Best Actor, Ken Stott 
 1997 Olivier Award for Best Director (Warchus)
 1997 Olivier Award Best for Set Designer (Mark Thompson)
 1997 Olivier Award for Best Lighting Designer (Hugh Vanstone)
 1998 Tony Award Best Actor in Play (Molina)
 1998 Tony Award Best Direction of a Play (Warchus)
 1998 Drama Desk Award for Outstanding New Play

References

Further reading

External links 
 

1994 plays
Broadway plays
French plays
New York Drama Critics' Circle Award winners
Laurence Olivier Award-winning plays
Tony Award-winning plays